Talur (also Romanized as Talūr, Tālūr, and Tolūr; also known as Talūz and Tel Nār) is a village in Livan Rural District, Now Kandeh District, Bandar-e Gaz County, Golestan Province, Iran. At the 2006 census, its population was 1,173, in 324 families.

References 

Populated places in Bandar-e Gaz County